Ayatollah Seyyed Mostafa Mousavi Faraz (also known as "Seyyed Mostafa Mousavi Esfahani"), is an Iranian Twelver Shia ayatollah who was born in 1944 in Isfahan among a religious family. This Shia cleric is a member of Assembly of Experts (from Hamedan province) since February 2016.

Mousavi Faraz's father was "Seyyed-Akbar Havaei" who was a draper. Seyyed Mostafa went to Hawzah; meanwhile, his father used to encourage him a lot to go to Hawzah, too. He commenced his Seminary education before finishing his elementary-school at the age of 14. He studied for 3 years in Isfahan Hawzah. Later on, he went to Qom seminary.

Teachers 
Seyyed Mostafa Mousavi-Fard had applied diverse teachers/scholars during his education period; amongst:
 Abdul-Ali Arab
 Mostafa Beheshti
 Morteza Haeri
 Makarem Shirazi
 Mohammad-Reza Golpaygani
 Jawad Tabrizi
Etc.

See also 
 List of members of Experts Assembly
 List of Ayatollahs

References 

1944 births
Iranian ayatollahs
Members of the Assembly of Experts
Shia clerics from Isfahan
Living people